Nicolás Javier Naranjo Sánchez (10 July 1990 – 12 September 2021) was an Argentine road cyclist, who rode for UCI Continental team .

Major results

2011
 2nd Road race, National Under-23 Road Championships
2014
 1st Prologue & Stages 1 & 2 Vuelta a San Juan
2015
 1st Stage 6 Vuelta a Mendoza
2016
 1st Prologue Vuelta a San Juan
 2nd Overall Giro del Sol San Juan
2017
 1st Doble Difunta Correa
 3rd Overall Doble Bragado
1st Stages 1, 2, 4 & 7b
 6th Overall Vuelta del Uruguay
1st Stage 7
2018
 1st Overall Giro del Sol San Juan
1st Prologue & Stages 4 (ITT) & 5
 1st Stage 2 Doble Calingasta
2019
 1st Overall Giro del Sol San Juan
1st Stages 1 & 4
 2nd Road race, National Road Championships
 4th Overall Vuelta del Uruguay
1st  Points classification
1st Stages 1, 3, 4, 5 & 10
2020
 1st Overall Giro del Sol San Juan
1st Stage 3

Death
He died from head injuries sustained in a crash while competing in a track and criterium event in Mendoza.

References

External links

1990 births
2021 deaths
Argentine male cyclists
Cyclists who died while racing
People from San Juan, Argentina
Road incident deaths in Argentina
Sportspeople from San Juan Province, Argentina